The Hudson Gardens & Event Center is a botanical garden and event venue located in Littleton, Colorado, 12 miles southwest of Denver. The property is composed of thirty acres of garden exhibits, trails, natural terrain, and event venues. 

The gardens opened to the public in June 1996. In 1999, the venue began to hold its annual "Hudson Gardens Summer Concert Series". The concert series is held at the 3,250-seat Hudson Gardens Concert Amphitheater, a temporary stage located on the Grassy South Lawn.

History 
The Gardens began in 1941 as the private garden of Colonel King C. and Evelyn Leigh Hudson. While living on the property, which was originally just five acres of land, the couple owned and managed the Country Kitchen to great success. The Hudsons also took care of large gardens on their property and were particularly fond of traveling extensively, closing the Country Kitchen during the winter season. Evelyn created "The King C. Hudson & Evelyn Leigh Hudson Foundation, Inc." before her death in 1988. Hudson Gardens became open to the public in 1996. 

Currently, a portion of Hudson Gardens is under construction due to Phase I of the River Integration Project, which is slated to be completed in June 2019. This project will open up access points from the property to the South Platte River Trail.

Hudson Gardens offers a summer concert series each year, as well as a holiday lights display, A Hudson Christmas.

Gardens 
They contain varied grounds ranging from high, dry prairie to river wetlands, and feature plants that thrive in the dry Colorado climate. The gardens include: Conifer Grove,  Deciduous Woodland, Garden Canopy, Herb Garden, Iris Bed, Mary Carter Greenway, Ornamental Grass Garden, Oval Garden, Rock Garden Canyon, Rose Garden,  Secret Garden, Shade Garden, Water Garden, Wetlands, Songbird Gardens, Vegetable Garden, Pumpkin Patch, and a Xeriscape Garden. Other garden features include a g-scale model railroad and honeybee apiary.

Hudson Gardens & Event Center offers 3 venues, including the Rose Garden, Monet's Place, and The Inn, for weddings, celebrations of life, and other ceremonies. Hudson Gardens also hosts corporate meetings, annual races, and more.

Facilities

Gardens
Oval Garden
Rose Garden
Honeybee Garden 
Herb and Vegetable Garden
Water Gardens 
Songbird Garden
Welcome Garden

Venues
The Inn at Hudson Gardens
The Garden Canopy
Garden Pavilion
Concert Amphitheater
The Overlook

Attractions
Victoria Water Lily Pond
Garden Railroad 
Aquatic Plant Holding Pond 
Monet's Place 
The Island

Performers

See also 
 List of botanical gardens in the United States

References

Botanical gardens in Colorado
Littleton, Colorado
Protected areas of Arapahoe County, Colorado
Music venues in Colorado
Music of Denver
1996 establishments in Colorado